WCCT-FM is a radio station on 90.3 FM in Harwich, Massachusetts, United States. It is the radio station of Cape Cod Regional Technical High School and broadcasts from a transmitter site on the campus.

The station has not operated since 2014, when it ceased rebroadcasting WBUR-FM of Boston. It had not produced its own programming since 2011.

History
On November 18, 1987, Cape Cod Tech filed with the Federal Communications Commission to build a new high school radio station on 90.3 FM. The high school envisioned the station as an educational tool for students in speech and journalism. The FCC granted CCT a construction permit on October 27, 1988, and the station, known as WCCT-FM, began broadcasting in September 1989, debuting in the 198990 school year. It was part of the now-defunct hotel and business management shop.

In 1992, it was one of three campus stations on Cape Cod to begin rebroadcasting the programming of WBUR-FM, an NPR station in Boston, under agreement, joining WKKL in Barnstable and WSDH in Sandwich. The idea was hatched by a local resident who noted both the poor signal of WBUR in the area and the underutilization of the WCCT facility. WBUR programming aired during most of the day and around the clock when the school was on summer vacation, with Cape Cod Tech output preempting the Boston public radio outlet from 1 to 2 p.m. on weekdays in 1992 and three hours a day by 1996. As part of the arrangement, WCCT exchanged its original transmitter, dating to 1945, for a new one furnished by WBUR, which also provided other technical support. The school's engineering shop maintained and repaired the equipment, much of which was donated. The station's broadcasts suffered from playing a format that had comparatively little interest to students, with a small and dated record library that included records from the 1960s and 1970s, classical music and old-time radio shows.

Student DJs ceased broadcasting on WCCT-FM in 2011. Three years later, WBUR informed the station that it was terminating the agreement on September 30, 2014. The move came after the station built a new and much more powerful station of its own, WBUH, at 89.1 FM, in nearby Brewster, in May 2014.

References

External links

Radio stations established in 1989
1989 establishments in Massachusetts
CCT-FM
Mass media in Barnstable County, Massachusetts
CCT-FM
Defunct radio stations in the United States
Harwich, Massachusetts
High school radio stations in the United States